Jim Read (born 18 November 1962) is a Canadian former alpine skier who competed in the 1984 Winter Olympics and 1988 Winter Olympics.

References

1962 births
Living people
Canadian male alpine skiers
Olympic alpine skiers of Canada
Alpine skiers at the 1984 Winter Olympics
Alpine skiers at the 1988 Winter Olympics